Acharia is a monotypic genus of flowering plants in the family Achariaceae. The sole species is Acharia tragodes, which is endemic to the Cape Provinces in South Africa.

The genus is named for Swedish botanist Erik Acharius (1757–1819). It was first published in Prodr. Pl. Cap. on page 14 in 1794.

References

External links
  Photo of leaves

Achariaceae
Plants described in 1794
Flora of the Cape Provinces